TVI África is a Portuguese television station owned and operated by Televisão Independente.

References

TVI Announced That In 2020 TVI África Will Shutdown To A Feed Of TVI International To Angola And Mozambique.

Television channels in Angola
Television channels in Mozambique
Television channels and stations established in 2015